The Italian 10 km road Championship (Campionato italiano 10 km corsa su strada in italian language) is the Italy national championship of the 10 km road held for the first time in 2010.

Editions

Winners

Men
2010: Stefano Baldini
2011: Stefano Scaini
2012: Domenico Ricatti
2013: Mohamed Laqouahi
2014: Andrea Lalli
2105: Manuel Cominotto
2016: Marouan Razine
2017: Yassine Rachik
2018: Marco Salami
2019: Lorenzo Dini
2020: Not disputed
2021: Iliass Aouani
2022: Pietro Riva

Women
2010: Agnes Tschurtschenthaler
2011: Valeria Straneo
2012: Valeria Straneo
2013: Veronica Inglese
2014: Laila Soufyane
2015: Anna Incerti
2016: Fatna Maraoui
2017: Fatna Maraoui
2018: Sara Dossena
2019: Fatna Maraoui
2020: Not disputed
2021: Sofiia Yaremchuk
2022: Sofiia Yaremchuk

See also
 Italian Athletics Championships
 10K run

References

External links
 FIDAL homepage

10K
10K runs
2010 establishments in Italy
Recurring sporting events established in 2010